Henna is a dye prepared from the plant Lawsonia inermis.

Henna may also refer to:

Names
 Henna (name), (حنا) an Arabic male name for John
 Julio J. Henna, 19th-century Puerto Rican physician and political figure

Places
 Henna, Iran, a village in Kerman Province, Iran
 Enna (or Henna or Haenna), city in Sicily, Italy
 Henna night, an Arab wedding ritual

Other
 Henna (film), 1991 Hollywood film
 "Henna" (song), a 2005 song by Cameron Cartio featuring Khaled
 Henna (ship), a cruise ship

See also
 Hanna (disambiguation)
 Hannah (disambiguation)
 Hennah, a surname
 Hina (disambiguation)
 Hinna, a borough of the city of Stavanger, Norway